Meander Creek is a stream in the U.S. state of Ohio, specifically the counties of Mahoning and Trumbull.
It is a tributary of the Mahoning River. The creek is impounded by the Meander Creek Reservoir.

The creek was so named on account of its meandering course.

See also
List of rivers of Ohio

References

Rivers of Mahoning County, Ohio
Rivers of Trumbull County, Ohio
Rivers of Ohio